is a passenger railway station in the city of Narashino, Chiba Prefecture, Japan, operated by the East Japan Railway Company (JR East).

Lines
Shin-Narashino Station is served by the Keiyō Line and is 28.3 kilometers from the starting point of the line at Tokyo Station, and 79.5 kilometers from Fuchūhommachi Station.

Station layout
Shin-Narashino Station consists of two elevated side platforms on either side of an island platform, serving four tracks in total. The station is staffed.

Platforms

History
The station opened on 3 March 1986.

Station numbering was introduced in 2016 with Shin-Narashino being assigned station number JE12.

Passenger statistics
In fiscal 2019, the station was used by an average of 13,295 passengers daily (boarding passengers only).

See also
 List of railway stations in Japan

References

External links

 JR East station information 

Railway stations in Chiba Prefecture
Railway stations in Japan opened in 1986
Narashino